In Greek mythology, Lynceus (Ancient Greek: Λυγκεύς "lynx-eyed") was a Messenian prince and one of the Argonauts who served as a lookout on the Argo. He also participated in the hunt for the Calydonian boar.

Family 
Lynceus was a son of Aphareus and Arene or Polydora or Laocoosa, and thus brother to Idas and Peisus.

Mythology 
Lynceus was the murderer of Castor, along with his brother, Idas. He helped Idas to spot and kill Castor, and was in turn killed by Pollux, but first managed to wound Pollux with a thrown rock.  Idas and Lynceus murdered Castor because he and his brother Pollux had kidnapped and married Phoebe and Hilaeira, the daughters of Leucippus, who were betrothed to Lynceus and Idas or possibly their relatives.

Lynceus was said to have excellent sight; enabling him to see through walls, trees, skin and the ground. This ability had been compared to the real technique of x-ray photography and to Superman's x-ray vision. According to some versions he was also able to see in the dark; in others his reputation for being able to see through the ground was simply a rumor that resulted from his knowledge of geology and gold-mining.

Notes

References 

 Apollodorus, The Library with an English Translation by Sir James George Frazer, F.B.A., F.R.S. in 2 Volumes, Cambridge, MA, Harvard University Press; London, William Heinemann Ltd. 1921. ISBN 0-674-99135-4. Online version at the Perseus Digital Library. Greek text available from the same website.
 Apollonius Rhodius, Argonautica translated by Robert Cooper Seaton (1853-1915), R. C. Loeb Classical Library Volume 001. London, William Heinemann Ltd, 1912. Online version at the Topos Text Project.
 Apollonius Rhodius, Argonautica. George W. Mooney. London. Longmans, Green. 1912. Greek text available at the Perseus Digital Library.
 Gaius Julius Hyginus, Fabulae from The Myths of Hyginus translated and edited by Mary Grant. University of Kansas Publications in Humanistic Studies. Online version at the Topos Text Project.
 Publius Ovidius Naso, Metamorphoses translated by Brookes More (1859-1942). Boston, Cornhill Publishing Co. 1922. Online version at the Perseus Digital Library.
 Publius Ovidius Naso, Metamorphoses. Hugo Magnus. Gotha (Germany). Friedr. Andr. Perthes. 1892. Latin text available at the Perseus Digital Library.

Argonauts
Princes in Greek mythology
Characters in the Argonautica
Messenian characters in Greek mythology